Abu al Barakat Sayyid Imam Ali Shah (1798-1965) was a senior Indian Sufi Saint. He was of the Qadiri Naqshbandi Sufi Order. He is from Rattan Chattar a village in Punjab that is called "the noble sanctuary" (Makan Sharif) in his honor. In the Qadiri Naqshbandi Sufi Order he is venerated as the "sustainer of the order in the world" (Qayyum ul Alam).

Early life 
Imam Ali Shah was born in Rattan Chattar to the Sufi Saint Sayyid Hussain Shah as member of a Naqvi Sayyid family whose genealogy traces back to Prophet Muhammad in the 35th generation through Imam Ali Naqi's son Sayyid Jafar al Zaki. Sayyid Hussain Shah was known as a revered ascetic and died when Imam Ali Shah was young. He then lived with his maternal grandparents together with his mother and brother. Imam Ali Shah was educated in Islamic Law (Fiqh) and Medicine and attended lectures in philosophy (Kalam) and Metaphysics (Sufism) at the Shrine of Fariduddin Ganjshakar together with his teacher Mawlana Jan Muhammad Chishti and his uncle. After graduating as a certified scholar, Imam Ali Shah served as his uncle's representative.

Career 
When his uncle passed away two years after his graduation, Imam Ali Shah participated in missionary activities. He founded a center called "mansion of holiness" (Dar ul Aqdas) where he centered his missionary activities. He was known for integrating philanthropic solutions like nutrition supply as well as establishing a center of Naqshbandi education in which 300 disciples could be instructed. Sources say that 300 goats had to be slaughtered in order to meet the daily demands of visitors and disciples, which reached one hundred thousand followers. His followers were mostly from South and Central Asia.

British Indian investigators mention Imam Ali Shah's popularity and that disciples were "flocking in bands" in order to pay tribute to him. He was described in their reports as a welcoming personality.

Notable teachings 
Imam Ali Shah is considered an inheritor of Prophet Muhammad and is said to emphacize the central importance of noble behavior (Adab) in Sufism. In this sense there is a legend that says, that he would stay mindful not turn his back towards the village of his second uncle.

Legacy 
Imam Ali Shah is venerated by the people of Rattan Chattar as their village's patron saint. Village inhabitants refer to Imam Ali Shah's blessings on the occasion of the lack of casualties during the Indo-Pakistani border skirmirshes in the 70s. He is considered by his followers to be the Mujaddid of the 13th lunar century alongside Imam Ali Shah's companion Sayyid Mir Jan, who acted as contemporary Imam of the Naqshbandiyya.

His descendants include Mir Mazhar ul Qayyum Shah as well as Sayyid Mahfooz Hussein Shah. They furthered Imam Ali Shah's legacy.

His tomb is situated near the Ravi river in the Batala and is considered by Gazetters as an "eye-filling" cultural heritage sight.

References 

19th-century Muslim theologians
Family of Muhammad
Hashemite people
Naqshbandi order
1798 births
1865 deaths
Sufi mystics
Sufi poets
Islam in India
Indian people of Arab descent